Mtara Maecha (born 28 February 1940) is a Comorian politician. He was foreign minister of Comoros from 1990 to 1991.  He was replaced by Said Hassan Said Hachim.

References

1940 births
Living people
Foreign ministers of the Comoros
Government ministers of the Comoros
Candidates for President of the Comoros